Eucalyptus scyphocalyx, commonly known as goblet mallee, is a species of mallee that is endemic to southern areas of Western Australia. It has smooth bark, lance-shaped adult leaves, flower buds in groups of three or seven, creamy white flowers and cup-shaped to cylindrical fruit.

Description
It has smooth pale brown and grey bark, although larger specimens often have a stocking of rough, ribbony bark near the base. Flowering mainly occurs from July or September to December and the flowers are creamy white.

Taxonomy and naming
The goblet mallet was first formally described in 1867 by George Bentham from an unpublished description by Ferdinand von Mueller. Bentham published the description in Flora Australiensis and the plant was given the name Eucalyptus dumosa var. scyphocalyx. In 1929, Joseph Maiden and William Blakely raised the variety to species status as E. scyphocalyx, publishing the change in Maiden's book A Critical Revision of the Genus Eucalyptus. The specific epithet (scyphocalyx) is from the ancient Greek word scyphos, referring to the cup-like calyx.

In 2001, Lawrie Johnson and Donald Blaxell described two subspecies of E. scyphocalyx in the journal Telopea and the names have been accepted by the Australian Plant Census:
 Eucalyptus scyphocalyx (F.Muell. ex Benth.) Maiden & Blakely subsp. scyphocalyx has flower buds in groups of seven;
 Eucalyptus scyphocalyx subsp. triadica  L.A.S.Johnson & K.D.Hill has flower buds in groups of three.

Distribution and habitat
Eucalyptus scyphocalyx is found on sand plains between Jerramungup, Ravensthorpe and Salmon Gums in the Great Southern and Goldfields-Esperance regions. Subspecies triadica has a more restricted distribution in an area northeast of Esperance.

Conservation status
This eucalypt is classified as "not threatened" by the Western Australian Government Department of Parks and Wildlife.

See also
List of Eucalyptus species

References

Eucalypts of Western Australia
Trees of Australia
scyphocalyx
Myrtales of Australia
Plants described in 1867
Mallees (habit)
Taxa named by George Bentham